Angels Gate is a -elevation summit located in the Grand Canyon, in Coconino County of Arizona, United States. Angels Gate is the place in Paiute mythology where the gods would return to earth by descending from the shadow world above. George Wharton James applied the "Angel Gate" name to this geographical feature in his book, In & Around the Grand Canyon, in 1900. This feature's name was officially adopted in 1906 by the U.S. Board on Geographic Names. Angels Gate has four peaks composed of Coconino Sandstone. The main highest summit and three spires are known as "Snoopy and his Doghouse" for a resemblance to Snoopy, and the first ascent was made April 1972 by Chuck Graf and Dave Ganci. According to the Köppen climate classification system, Angels Gate is located in a cold semi-arid climate zone.

Geology

The summit of Angels Gate is composed of remnant, cliff-forming, Permian Coconino Sandstone. The sandstone, which is the third-youngest of the strata in the Grand Canyon, was deposited 265 million years ago as sand dunes. Below the Coconino Sandstone is slope-forming, Permian Hermit Formation, which in turn overlays the Pennsylvanian-Permian Supai Group. Further down are strata of Mississippian Redwall Limestone, Cambrian Tonto Group, and finally Proterozoic Unkar Group at creek level and Granite Gorge. Precipitation runoff from Angels Gate drains south to the Colorado River.

Gallery

Hawkins Butte

Hawkins Butte is a -elevation butte attached at the southwest end of Angels Gate. It was officially named in 1932 after William "Billy" Robert Hawkins, the hunter and cook for John Wesley Powell's 1869 expedition down the Colorado River through the Grand Canyon. It is primarily composed of exposed cliffs of Redwall Limestone overlaying Tonto Group.

See also
 Geology of the Grand Canyon area
 Dunn Butte

References

External links 

 Weather forecast: National Weather Service
 Angels Gate rock climbing: Mountainproject.com
 Photo of Billy Hawkins: NY Public Library
 Billy Hawkins' account of expedition: Rockhounds.com
 Angels Gate photo by Harvey Butchart

Grand Canyon
Landforms of Coconino County, Arizona
Mountains of Arizona
Mountains of Coconino County, Arizona
North American 2000 m summits
Colorado Plateau
Grand Canyon National Park